Anastasius II (died 719) was the Byzantine emperor from 713 to 715. During his reign he reversed his predecessor's decision to appoint a Monothelete Patriarch of Constantinople. He instead re-elevated Orthodoxy in Constantinople by appointing Germanus I to the position in order to gain Pope Constantine's favor. His reign was spent attempting to reinforce the Empire and bring it into an era of stability. He was deposed by Theodosius during the Byzantine campaign against the Umayyad Caliphate in 715. Four years later, in 719, Anastasius would launch a rebellion against Emperor Leo III with the intent to reclaim the throne. He initially received support in the form of soldiers and funds from Tervel of Bulgaria. But once Anastasius failed to enter Constantinople, the Bulgar forces he had brought complied with a request from Leo III to turn Anastasius and his allies over. Anastasius would then be executed with other members of the rebellion in 719.

Biography
Anastasius was a Greek, originally had the baptismal name of Artemios (male form of Artemis), and had served as a bureaucrat and Imperial secretary (asekretis) for his predecessors as Emperor. During this time, the Byzantine Empire was in a time of instability and crisis known as The Twenty Years’ Anarchy. Imperial authority was unstable after the last dynastic ruler, Justinian II, was initially dethroned. Byzantium experienced a quick succession of four rulers from 695-713. The fourth ruler being Philippicus Bardanes (Philippikos), who overthrew Justinian II for a second time. His policy led to the deposition of the Orthodoxy patriarch of Constantinople in favor of a Monothelete one. This was an unpopular move as the vast majority of Byzantium was Orthodox. It was also unpopular with the church in Rome and alienated the monarchy from the church. Philippicus also prioritized defending against the Bulgars and allocated troops to defend Constantinople. Which allowed the Umayyad Caliphate  to advance on the empire’s eastern front. All these things caused Philippicus’ reign to be plagued with discontent among the populace.

This discontent would lead the troops of the Opsikion Theme stationed in Thrace to overthrow Emperor Philippicus Bardanes in 713. Philippicus was blinded to both prevent him from leading a counter rebellion, as Justinian II had done. But also because the emperor of the Byzantines, traditionally, had to be free of physical imperfections. In blinding him, they hoped to disqualify him from ever being Emperor again both culturally and practically. Effectively stabilizing the line of succession from previous rulers threatening it. The day after Philippicus’ blinding, the conspirators then chose Artemios as Emperor. He chose Anastasius as his regnal name. Having ascended the throne, the same manner Philippicus did, it was also a distinct possibility he could have left it the same way. To remain on the throne, Anastasius needed stability within the military for both the purposes of preventing another coup and to ensure Imperial control over the military. He did this by blinding and exiling the officers directly responsible for conspiring against his predecessor. This was likely to discourage future rebellions .

Rule 

Anastasius' reign was spent attempting to stabilize the Byzantine Empire. He endeavored to reverse the religious reforms his predecessor had put in place. Anastasius upheld the decisions of the Sixth Ecumenical Council and deposed the Monothelete Patriarch John VI of Constantinople, replacing him with the orthodox Patriarch Germanus in 715. This served several purposes, first being it quelled the unrest in the orthodoxy population of Constantinople. It also served as furthering Anastasius’ legitimacy as Emperor. Because his rule was the result of a rebellion, he needed as much proof of legitimacy as he could to keep imperial authority stable. And so, by re-elevating Orthodoxy, it put an end to the short-lived schism between the monarchy and the Catholic Church. This would continue a pattern of Byzantine Emperor’s attempting to reconcile with Rome. But as an Emperor who was the product of a coup, Anastasius had a need for symbols of legitimacy. And so, gaining the approval of Pope Constantine would have provided him with a symbol his predecessor did not have, making him more legitimate by comparison.

Additionally, Anastasius took steps to correct the sorry state of the Byzantine Empire’s defenses and address the problem of the land that the Byzantine empire had lost. The advancing Umayyad Caliphate surrounded the Empire by land and sea (they penetrated as far as Galatia in 714), and Anastasius attempted to restore peace by diplomatic means. His emissaries having failed in Damascus, he undertook the restoration of Constantinople's walls, the construction of siege equipment, the stockpiling of food, and the rebuilding of the Byzantine fleet. The death of the Caliph al-Walid I in 715 gave Anastasius an opportunity to turn the tables on his rival. He dispatched an army under Leo the Isaurian, afterwards emperor, to invade Syria, and he had his fleet concentrate on Rhodes with orders not only to resist the approach of the enemy but to destroy their naval stores. Re-conquering land lost to the Caliphate would have both offered the practical advantages of expanding the empire's borders as well as acting as a display of the new regimes strength.

Deposition 
At Rhodes, Opsician troops, resenting Anastasius’ actions taken after his ascension, mutinied, and killed the admiral, John. They then elected to have an Emperor ready before they overthrew Anastasius and proclaimed as emperor Theodosius III (Theodosios), a tax-collector of little renown. After a six-month siege, Constantinople was taken by Theodosius; Anastasius, who had fled to Nicaea, was eventually compelled to submit to the new emperor and retired to a monastery in Thessalonica. Theophanes the Confessor states that Anastasius reigned for 1 year and 3 months, which would place his deposition in September 715. However, another possible date is November 715.

Rebellion 
Theodosius was later deposed by Leo III who had previously served under Anastasius. Leo would rule over two crises in quick succession. First was a siege at Constantinople by the Umayyad Caliphate. Which created confusion at whether Constantinople had been conquered or not. Troops in Sicily declared for a new Emperor, believing the capitol to be conquered. While they were quelled, by the time the siege had lifted on August 15th, 718, both a siege and a rebellion made it appear as though Leo’s new government was weak.  After seeing this, Anastasius chose to rebel to reclaim the Byzantine throne. 

In 719. Anastasius left Thessalonica to head a revolt against Leo III. Though who incited the rebellion is contested as Patriarch Nikephoros says Anastasius engineered the plot himself. While Theophanes the Confessor claims Niketas Xylinites initiated the plot by writing to Anastasius. Regardless, Anastasius petitioned Tervel of Bulgaria for support and received many troops alongside financial support of 50,000 litres of gold. However, the chronicler Theophanes the Confessor, who offers this information elsewhere, confuses Tervel with his eventual successor Kormesiy, so perhaps Anastasios was allied with the younger ruler. Another explanation holds that Kormesiy represented Tervel during the Bulgarians' negotiation with Anastasius. 

Despite the success of the coups during the Twenty Years Anarchy, rebellion had a high chance of failure. So Anastasius must have had a reason he believed the risk to be worth it. One explanation is that he saw the siege of Constantinople and the small rebellion as a sign that the state was weak enough that a rebellion could succeed. Another explanation is that Anastasius held a genuine belief that the Empire was in crisis and that he was one of the only people who could save it. And finally, there is the option that Theophanes was accurate and he was counseled into rebellion by Niketas Xylinites.

While his motivations remain a mystery, with the Bulgar forces, Anastasius marched on Constantinople. Having written the Master of the Walls in Constantinople, named Niketas Anthrakas, and asked them to open the gates when he arrived. The message was discovered and Niketas was beheaded, removing Anastasius’ ability to easily enter Constantinople. Now unable to enter the city, the Bulgarian’s complied with Leo III’s request to turn Anastasius and his conspirators over. He was killed along with other conspirators including Niketas Xylinitas and the archbishop of Thessaloniki in 719. Anastasius' wife Irene had him buried in the Church of the Holy Apostles.

Historiography 
Anastasius’ historical coverage began decades after his death with Theophanes the Confessor and Patriarch Nikephoros. Both were byzantine scholars who covered Anastasius II during their writings about much larger swaths of history. Their coverage of Anastasius was mostly focused on the rebellion Anastasius launched against Leo III. Being the most available accounts written close to the event's occurrence, they are often used as sources for later writing’s about Anastasius.

His coverage would remain in the context of covering greater periods of time as history progressed into the 1900’s. The most common form of coverage is an account of his reign after an account of Philippicus’, his predecessor’s, reign. These records portray Anastasius in a positive light in a relative sense to Philippicus. There is also coverage of Anastasius in works that cover Bulgarian actions during his lifetime.

More recent sources are sparser in coverage either being encyclopedic in nature or covering Anastasius in relation to Leo III. Though it is most common to see Anastasius’ name mentioned briefly with little about who he was. One explanation for the quantity of works on Anastasius II is that Leo III is typically credited as the emperor that succeeded where Anastasius did not. And so, there are more works discussing Leo III and his achievements instead of Anastasius II. This, combined with a short reign, and few primary sources could explain his lack of coverage.

See also

List of Byzantine emperors
Twenty Years Anarchy

References

Bibliography
 Burke, John, and Roger Scott, Byzantine Macedonia: Identity, Image, and History 13, Leiden: Brill, 2017.
 Bury, John B, The Cambridge Medieval History 2, edited by Henry M Gwatkin and James P Whitney, Macmillan press, 1913.
 Chisholm, Hugh. Encyclopaedia Britannica. 1, 11th ed, Cambridge University Press, 1911.
 Gregory, Timothy E. “Weak Emperors and Near Anarchy,” in A History of Byzantium, 2nd ed., Malden, MA: Wiley-Blackwell, 2011.
 Grigoriou-Ioannidou, Martha. “Monoxyla, Slavs, Bulgars, and the Coup Organised by Artemios-Anastasios II.” Balkan Stuides 39, no. 2 (1998): 181–95. 
 Longworth, Philip, The Making of Eastern Europe: From Prehistory to Postcommunism, Basingstoke: Macmillan Press, 1999.
 Noahm. “Philippikos (711–713).” Dumbarton Oaks, August 19, 2020. https://www.doaks.org/resources/online-exhibits/gods-regents-on-earth-a-thousand-years-of-byzantine-imperial-seals/rulers-of-byzantium/philippikos-711201313. 
 “Anastasius II (A.D.713-715).” Roman Emperors An Online Encyclopedia of Roman Rulers and Their Families, November 25, 2000. http://www.roman-emperors.org/anastasii.htm. 
 Sheppard, Si, and Graham Turner, Constantinople AD 717-18: The Crucible of History, Oxford: Osprey Publishing, 2020.
 Sumner, Graham V. “Philippicus, Anastasius II and Theodosius III.” Greek, Roman and Byzantine Studies 17 (1976). 
 Torgerson, Jesse W. “Introduction,” in The Chronographia of George the Synkellos and Theophanes: The Ends of Time in Ninth-Century Constantinople, Brill, 2022.

External links 

 
 

8th-century Byzantine emperors
Byzantine usurpers
Eastern Orthodox monks
7th-century births
719 deaths
Executed Byzantine people
8th-century executions by the Byzantine Empire
Twenty Years' Anarchy
710s in the Byzantine Empire